Homagama Divisional Secretariat is a  Divisional Secretariat  of Colombo District, of Western Province, Sri Lanka.

List of divisions
Rilawala Grama Niladhari Division
Siyambalagoda South Grama Niladhari Division
Kirigampamunuwa Grama Niladhari Division

References
 Divisional Secretariats Portal

Divisional Secretariats of Colombo District